Pierre Russell (December 13, 1949 – June 12, 1995) was an American basketball player.

Biography
Russell was born Pierre Angelo Russell on December 13, 1949, in Kansas City, Kansas. He attended Wyandotte High School.

Career
Russell played two seasons for the Kentucky Colonels of the American Basketball Association. Previously, he had been drafted by the Milwaukee Bucks in the thirteenth round of the 1971 NBA Draft. He played at the collegiate level at the University of Kansas.

References

1949 births
1995 deaths
American men's basketball players
Basketball players from Kansas
Kansas Jayhawks men's basketball players
Kentucky Colonels players
Milwaukee Bucks draft picks
Parade High School All-Americans (boys' basketball)
Shooting guards
Sportspeople from Kansas City, Kansas